The Frauenfeld–Wil railway is a  railway line  in Switzerland, which connects the town of Frauenfeld in the canton of Thurgau, to the town of Wil in the canton of St. Gallen, following the valley of the Murg river. The Frauenfeld-Wil-Bahn (FWB) opened the line in 1887 and operated it until 2021, when that company merged into Appenzell Railways. The line is included in Tarifverbund Ostwind, and operates as service S15 of the St. Gallen S-Bahn.

Plans to build an interurban tramway between Frauenfeld and Wil were first made in the early 1850s. The rail line opened in 1887, and was electrified in 1921. Around 1.25 million passengers use the line every year.

Locals call the train "Wilerbähnli" or "Wiler Bähnli".

Operation

Trains run every 30 minutes as S15 service of St. Gallen S-Bahn, requiring 3 trains in operation at once, with trains crossing at the stations of Matzingen and Schweizerhof.

In 2011 the railway company ordered five new ABe4/8 low floor trains from Stadler Rail, to replace the old trains. However, there are plans for a 15 minutes interval in future and therefore some of the old trains will be retained. The first train was delivered in March 2013 and was tested for 3 months. It went into regular service on 26 June 2013. FWB closed the station at Murkart in 2018 in order to maintain connections with long-distance trains at Frauenfeld.

Route 
  –  – 

 Frauenfeld
 
  (stops only on request)
  (stops only on request)
 
  (stops only on request)
  (stops only on request)
 Wängi
  (stops only on request)
  (stops only on request)
 
 Wil SG

Freight traffic 
Freight trains ran on the line from 1907 until the early 2000s. This included transporter wagons from 1977 onwards.

References

Further reading

External links

 
 fw-bahn.ch  Official Website
 125 Jahre Frauenfeld-Wil-Bahn - Geschichte und Zukunft der Regionalbahn
 Frauenfeld-Wil-Bahn buys five new Stadler vehicles Stadler Media Release, June 30, 2011
 bahnweb.ch bahnweb.ch

Frauenfeld
Metre gauge railways in Switzerland
Railway lines in Switzerland
Railway lines opened in 1887
Transport in the canton of St. Gallen
Transport in Thurgau